Sarbandan (also Romanized as Sarbandān) is a village in, and the capital of, Abarshiveh Rural District of the Central District of Damavand County, Tehran province, Iran. At the 2006 National Census, its population was 2,304 in 618 households. The following census in 2011 counted 2,415 people in 744 households. The latest census in 2016 showed a population of 3,352 people in 823 households; it was the largest village in its rural district.

The village of Sarbandan is between of Jaban and Seid abad villages. The reason for this name is the abundance of water in Sarbandan which supplies the water to downstream villages.

Sarbandan's good weather and fresh water attract many tourists in summer. Many vegetables and fruits are produced in Sarbandan's farms. The local walnuts, cucumbers and apples are flavourful and thus exported to other cities or countries.

The people of the town of Sarbandan, as well as neighboring Jaban, Sorkhdeh and Khosravan are Kurds and speak the Kurmanji dialect of Kurdish language.

References 

Damavand County

Populated places in Tehran Province

Populated places in Damavand County